The 2015 Motor City Open is an International 70 tournament of the PSA World Tour. The event took place at the Birmingham Athletic Club in Detroit in the United States from 24 January to 27 January 2015. Miguel Ángel Rodriguez won his first Motor City Open title, beating Stephen Coppinger in the final.

Prize money and ranking points
For 2015, the prize purse was $70,000. The prize money and points breakdown is as follows:

Seeds

Draw and results

See also
2015 PSA World Tour
Motor City Open (squash)

References

External links
PSA Motor City Open 2015 website
Motor City Open 2015 official website

Motor City Open (squash)
2015 in American sports
2015 in sports in Michigan
2015 in squash